The Madera Sugar Pine Company was a lumber company that operated in the Sierra Nevada region of California during the late 19th and early 20th centuries. It was known for its use of innovative technologies, such as the first log flume and logging railroad in the southern Sierra, and the adoption of the Steam Donkey engine in commercial logging. The company had a significant impact on the region, leading to the founding of several towns, including Madera, Fish Camp, and  Sugar Pine, as well as the growth of Fresno Flats and the formation of Madera County. In addition, the company contributed to the agriculture in California in California through its production of wooden shipping boxes and was involved in a U.S. Supreme Court case related to employer obligations. 

At its peak, The Madera Sugar Pine Company employed over 600 men in its logging operations and another 1,000 men in its lumbering plant, and produced 50 million board feet of lumber annually. Most of the company's production was exported outside of California, and it even supplied two carloads of "the best Sugar Pine in the world" for Theodore Roosevelt's reconstruction of the White House. In total, the company logged over  acres and produced over 1.3 billion board feet of lumber before closing permanently in 1933 due to declining lumber supply and demand caused by The Great Depression. Despite the economic challenges of the time, The Madera Sugar Pine Company had shown a profit in every year of its operation.  

In 1961, service resumed as the Yosemite Mountain Sugar Pine Railroad, a heritage railway. The railroad is built on a  section of the original railroad grade used between 1908 and 1924.

Predecessors

The California Lumber Company (1874–1878) 

In February 1874, the California Lumber Company was established with the goal of transporting lumber from the Sierra Nevada to the recently completed railroad in the San Joaquin Valley. The ambitious endeavor required the construction of lumber camps and mills, as well as a log flume to transport the lumber down from high elevations in the Sierra.

A 54-mile (87 km) log flume - the longest of its kind - was built to transport rough cut lumber from the mountains to the valley floor in Madera, where it could be finished and sold to the global market through the Southern Pacific Railroad. The route was surveyed in 1873 and construction began in 1874. The project required many high trestles to span the mountains and rolling foothills. The flume was ready for the 1877 season, with an estimated construction cost of $250,000.

However, the California Lumber Company faced challenges with the creeping of lumber over the sides of the flume, resulting in both a loss for the operation and potential damage to the flume itself. William Thurman, one of the founders of the company, created a novel technique of clamping bundles of lumber together to prevent them from going over the edge during transport. His flume clamp was patented in 1877.

Despite these innovations, the company was underfinanced and was forced to cease operations after only three seasons, due to the drought of 1877.

The Madera Flume and Trading Company (1878–1899) 
In 1878, the California Lumber Company underwent a major overhaul and was rebranded as the Madera Flume and Trading Company. The new firm expanded logging operations by constructing a four-mile narrow gauge railway that connected the Soquel Mill to a flume, allowing for the transportation of more timber from further outlying areas.

In the late 1880s, the Madera Flume and Lumber Company made history by being the first to replace oxen teams with steam donkeys in a commercial logging operation. The steam donkey, a small steam engine, allowed loggers to cut and transport more trees and work in any weather condition, thus increasing seasonal lumber production.

In 1881, the Soquel Mill was built and connected to a lengthened log flume upstream from the original California Mill. In 1882, a second California Mill was established near Nelder Grove. However, this mill lacked a nearby water source, so lumber was transported by a forest tramway to connect to the flume. By this time, the company was able to transport 100,000 board feet of finished lumber to Madera daily.

In 1889, the company introduced Betsy, an early Shay locomotive. She was the first of her kind to operate in the southern Sierra Nevada and represented a significant advancement in logging techniques and efficiency. The Visalia Weekly Delta reported on the innovation.

Betsy had a unique design, with a small cab that required the engineer to also serve as the fireman. Despite this quirk, Betsy became one of the longest-serving Shay locomotives in the Sierra and remained in service through the 1930s..

Logging the Giant Sequoia 

In the late 1800s, loggers in Nelder Grove cut down many giant sequoias. However, the wood from these trees had limited commercial potential due to its tendency to break apart when felled and its inferior suitability for construction compared to old-growth sugar pine and ponderosa. Despite this, more than 100 of the largest sequoias in the grove survived clearcutting by 1897.

By the late 1890s, the Madera Flume and Trading Company began to decline as access to available timber tracts dwindled and demand for lumber exports weakened during a long economic depression. The California Lumber Company mills were permanently shut down and the company filed for bankruptcy in 1878. Only the Madera lumber yard continued to operate on a limited basis, sustained by contract loggers feeding cut logs to the flume.

The Madera Sugar Pine Company (1899–1931) 
By the turn of the century, the old-growth white pine of the upper Midwest had become depleted. Sugar pine, with its large size and straight grain, became a highly valued substitute for white pine. This led many established lumber interests to push westward into the Sierra Nevada.

In 1889, Arthur Hill, a Michigan-born timber magnate, and his associates purchased the assets of the Madera Flume and Trading Company and expanded its operations. Its existing logging railroad was extended to newly secured timber tracts, and the flume to Madera was reconstructed. The scale of the operation was expanded to rival the Fresno Flume and Irrigation Company and Sanger Lumber Company, which had sprung up as competitors.

The sugar pine tree became the central symbol for the reincorporated company. It featured in the company's name and logo and became the namesake for the newly constructed company town and state-of-the-art mill.

Log flume reconstruction 
A new earth dam on the Lewis Fork of the Fresno River served two purposes. It formed a log pond to serve the new Sugar Pine mill and created a water source for a new flume head. The completely rebuilt flume followed the original  route through Fresno Flats, dropping a total of  elevation on the journey to Madera. The flume cost $275,000 to construct, an average of $5000 per mile. It used approximately 5,700,000 feet of redwood lumber and 2100 kegs of nails.

1922 Sugar Pine fire 
A catastrophic fire swept through the town on September 9, 1922. The sawmill, lumber yard, and  acres of surrounding forest were destroyed.

Madera Sugar Pine immediately announced plans to rebuild and expand. Equipment was ordered, manufactured and shipped from the eastern US by rail, including a modern two-band sawmill. Operations resumed the following April with an expanded capacity of 350,000 board feet a day.

Life and Work

The sawmill community at Sugar Pine was diverse, with workers from many different nationalities. Social status within the community was based on a person's position with the company, and housing was allocated accordingly. Management lived in the upper canyon, sawmill workers in the lower canyon, and shop workers on the side of the hill. Loggers would live in seasonal camps in the woods, where they would sleep four to a shack and eat in a common cookhouse. Chinese laborers, whose jobs were limited to the flume, drying yard and sawmill, lived in a separate Chinatown area south of the mill.

Chinese Labor 
Chinese workers, many of whom had arrived during the California Gold Rush, played a significant role in completing the Madera Flume and filling many of the jobs in the Sugar Pine lumber yards. However, these Chinese workers faced significant discrimination and segregation in the workplace and in their daily lives. They were relegated to low-paying jobs as common laborers, were hired and paid through a middleman, and lived in a separate Chinatown apart from the rest of the community. Anti-Chinese sentiment and lack of legal protection also hindered the Chinese workers' experience, particularly in the wake of the Chinese Exclusion Act.

In 1922, Madera Sugar Pine decided to replace these Chinese laborers with Mexican laborers who had become readily available following the Immigration Act of 1917. In a move that would send a clear signal that Chinese workers were no longer welcome, the company set fire to Chinatown at the end of the logging season, waiting until the first snowfall to ensure that no other structures would be damaged in the blaze. This incident highlights the discrimination and injustice faced by Chinese workers in the logging industry during the early 20th century.

Sex Work 
Prostitution flourished in the Sierra during the logging days. The San Francisco fire of 1906 left many sex workers without work, so they went to the logging camps. Law enforcement left them be, and they traded at the company store and received medical care at the company hospital. They accepted all customers, showing no discrimination beyond the ability to pay.

The first brothel for the loggers of Madera Sugar Pine Company was called Kamook, located four miles from Sugar Pine. Tipperary was the most popular. Named after the popular song, Tipperary featured a main parlor house and four individual cabins. Accommodations at Kamook were scarce, so the sex workers set up a tent community called "Happy Camp" two miles away in Fish Camp, California. Business boomed, and the sex workers soon hired carpenters to construct a permanent brothel.

Prostitution houses stood for just over twenty years, Tipperary being the first to fall when the logs near Big Creek were depleted and the logging moved on. Happy Camp and Kamook persisted until the 1920s.

Supreme Court case 
In the 1923 case Madera Sugar Pine Co. v. Industrial Accident Commission of California, the United States Supreme Court upheld death benefits to the non-resident alien dependents of employees who died as a result of no-fault industrial accidents. The decision upheld the Workmen's Compensation Act of California, which was found to not be in violation of the U.S. Constitution. The ruling required that the Madera Sugar Pine Company compensate the partially dependent survivors of two Mexican laborers who had died on the job. This case established the legal principle that non-resident alien dependents are entitled to the same compensation as citizens under the state's worker's compensation laws.

Liquidation 
The mill at Sugar Pine ceased activity in November 1931 with wood piling up in the Madera lumber yard due to the Great Depression. With the economic situation showing no signs of improvement by 1933, the flume, lumber yard, planing mill and box factory were permanently closed. Every locomotive was sold or scrapped.

Locomotive Roster 

The Madera Sugar Pine Company (MSP) operated a fleet of seven locomotives. Of these engines, four were given official names, while the remaining three were assigned numerical designations. The first of these engines, Engine Number One, also known as Betsy, was a pioneering machine in the region. Despite its unconventional and early design, Betsy proved to be a reliable workhorse and remained in constant service until the MSP ceased operations in the early 1930s.

Betsy was a unique machine, with a small cab that required the engineer to also serve as the fireman. This quirk, however, did not detract from its performance, and Betsy became one of the longest-serving Shay locomotives in the Sierra. Its tendency to jump the track was a minor inconvenience.

On runs from the sawmill to the woods, Engine Number 2, 3, and 4 generally pulled 15 empty log cars, while the larger three truck Shay locomotives, Engine Number 5 and Engine Number 6, could each pull 22 empty log cars. The length of incoming trains depended on the use of railroad grades at the time. The Shay locomotives were never turned, instead, the front end always pointed up the hill, a testament to their versatility. To enhance visibility and safety, the company retrofitted its Shay locomotives with battery-powered lights. However, these lights proved only as bright as oil lamps when fully charged. 
In 1933, the sawmill closed, and the company chose to dismantle the railroad in 1934, marking the end of an era for the Madera Sugar Pine Company, and all the engines were sold and scrapped by 1937.

Yosemite Mountain Sugar Pine Railroad 

In 1961, service resumed as the Yosemite Mountain Sugar Pine Railroad, a heritage railway. The railroad is built on a  section of the original railroad grade used between 1908 and 1924.

References

Further reading

External links 
 Yosemite Mountain Sugar Pine Railroad

Logging in the United States
History of the Sierra Nevada (United States)
Heritage railroads in California
3 ft gauge railways in the United States
Narrow gauge railroads in California
Sierra National Forest
Sierra Nevada (United States)
Transportation in Mariposa County, California
Defunct California railroads
Railway companies established in 1874
American companies established in 1874
Railway companies disestablished in 1931
Closed railway lines in the United States